Simin Safamehr (born 14 June 1947) is an Iranian sprinter. She competed in the women's 100 metres and women's long jump at the 1964 Summer Olympics. She was the first woman to represent Iran at the Olympics.

References

External links
 

1947 births
Living people
Athletes (track and field) at the 1964 Summer Olympics
Iranian female sprinters
Iranian female long jumpers
Olympic athletes of Iran
Place of birth missing (living people)